Apollo 11 is a television docudrama film which aired on November 17, 1996 on The Family Channel. It was nominated for  a Primetime Emmy.

Development 
The film was developed in response to the positive reviews of the 1995 film Apollo 13. Executive producer James Manos Jr. thinks the reason no movie was made previously was that, "at first glance it didn't seem as if anything dramatic happened".

They received NASA's permission to record portions of the film in the original Apollo Mission Control Center. Engineers at the complex volunteered to make some of the equipment work like it did in 1969, to add authenticity.

Buzz Aldrin, one of the three Apollo 11 astronauts, contributed to this movie as technical consultant. He was not always on the film set, but he made an effort to keep up with the film's production. He was filmed for a cameo, but the scene was cut. During the scene, he played a clergyman that interacted with Xander Berkeley, who portrayed Aldrin in the film. Neil Armstrong was asked by Aldrin if he was interested in participating in the film's creation, but Armstrong never got back to him.

Plot
Fearful that the Soviets would continue their lead in the Space Race and be the first to put a man on the Moon, NASA felt an enormous pressure to push the Apollo Program forward as quickly as possible, though they knew that pushing too hard could lead to disaster. This film recreates the tensions that were felt not only by the three astronauts, Neil Armstrong, Buzz Aldrin, and Michael Collins, but also by their families and by the teams of technicians training to deal with anything that could go wrong.

Cast

Jeffrey Nordling as commander Neil Armstrong
Xander Berkeley as Apollo Lunar Module pilot Buzz Aldrin. Berkeley was also cast in Apollo 13, which was thought to have aided him in acquiring this role
Jim Metzler as Command module pilot Michael Collins
Jane Kaczmarek as Jan Armstrong
Wendie Malick as Pat Collins
Maureen Mueller as Joan Aldrin
Matt Frewer as Gene Kranz

Release
The film was released on Sunday, November 17, 1996 on The Family Channel at 7 p.m. EST as a part of a FAM Sunday Night Movie Event. Following the movie on the premiere night, Aldrin and others answered questions about spaceflight live in a feature titled From the Moon to Mars.

The film was nominated for a 1997 Primetime Emmy for Sound Mixing for a Drama, Miniseries, or Special.

See also
 Apollo 11 in popular culture

References

External links
 

1996 television films
1996 films
ABC Family original films
American films based on actual events
American television docudramas
Documentary films about the space program of the United States
Films about astronauts
Films about the Apollo program
Apollo 11
Films set in Houston
Films shot in Houston
American space adventure films
Cultural depictions of Neil Armstrong
Cultural depictions of Buzz Aldrin
MTM Enterprises films
Cultural depictions of Michael Collins (astronaut)
1990s American films